Uchechukwu Peter Umezurike commonly known as Uche Peter Umez is a Nigerian author. Umez's first published work of poetry, Dark through the Delta, deals with the recurring despoliation of Nigeria using the Niger Delta as its motif.

A graduate of Government & Public Administration from Abia State University, Umez is also the author of Tears in her Eyes (short stories) and Aridity of Feelings (poems). He has a master's degree in English Studies from the University of Port Harcourt and is currently a PhD student at the University of Alberta, Canada.

Works

Children's Fiction
 Tim the Monkey and Other Stories (Africana First Publishers, 2013) 
 The Boy Who Throws Stones at Animals and Other Stories (Melrose Books, 2011) 
 The Runaway Hero (Jalaa Writers’ Collective, 2011)
 Sam and the Wallet (Funtime TV Enterprises, 2007)

Short fiction
 Tears in Her Eyes (Edu-Edy Publications, 2005)

Poetry
 Aridity of Feelings (Edu-Edy Publications, 2006)
 Dark through the Delta (Edu-Edy Publications, 2004)

Awards and grants
 Alumnus, International Writing Program, Iowa City, USA, 2008
 Laureate, UNESCO-Aschberg, Sanskriti Kendra, India, 2009
 Alumnus, Caine Prize for African Writing Workshop, Accra, Ghana, 2009
 Fellow, Chateau de Lavigny, Switzerland, 2010
 Shortlisted, Nigeria LNG Prize for Literature, 2011
 Fellow, Civitella Ranieri, Italy, 2012
 Winner Nigeria Prize for Literary Criticism 2021

References

Nigerian writers
Living people
University of Port Harcourt alumni
1975 births